The 2021 Kansas State Wildcats football team represented Kansas State University during the 2021 NCAA Division I FBS football season. The Wildcats played their home games at the Bill Snyder Family Football Stadium in Manhattan, Kansas, and competed in the Big 12 Conference. The team was led by third-year head coach Chris Klieman.

Previous season

The Wildcats finished the 2020 regular season 4–6 and 4–5 in Big 12 play to finish in seventh in the conference. They removed themselves from consideration to play in a post season bowl game.

Preseason

Big 12 media poll

Schedule
The 2021 schedule consists of 7 home 5 away, and 1 neutral site game in the regular season.

Game summaries

vs. Stanford

Sources:

Kansas State began with a 15-point lead at halftime with performances by quarterback Skylar Thompson and running back Deuce Vaughn. The Wildcats managed to score 24 points before allowing Stanford to put points on the board with 3:16 left in the game. Stanford coach David Shaw stated:  "This game was not indicative of how hard we've played, how hard we've practiced and how well we practiced. Disappointing to me that we didn't go out there and execute better." Shaw is in his 11th season as Stanford's coach.

Kansas State dominated on defense and Stanford's offense continued to make mistakes while not producing a strong running game performance. Kansas State defense only allowed 39 total rushing yards for the game.

The Wichita Eagle reported that the stadium was mostly filled with Kansas State fans and that Kansas State significantly out-performed Stanford. Specifically, the paper published "The Kansas State football team opened its season with a statement victory on Saturday at AT&T Stadium."

Stanford's next game is their sixth consecutive road game, traveling to play the USC Trojans.  Kansas State will play at home in Manhattan against Southern Illinois.

No. 8 (FCS) Southern Illinois

Sources: ESPN Box Score ESPN Team Stats

Southern Illinois came in to the game with split #8/#9 rankings in the FCS.  Before the game, SIU head coach Nick Hill said his team will focus on running:  "We're gonna to try to esablish the line of scrimmage and run the ball, but ultimately it's our job to move the ball, whatever you've gotta do."  SIU defeated Southeast Missouri State the previous week by a score of 47–21.

Kansas State was leading 21–3 in the second quarter when starting quarterback Skylar Thompson left the game with an injured knee.  With backup quarterback Will Howard stepping in, SIU pulled ahead at halftime 23–21 with multiple mistakes for Kansas State.  SIU failed to score in the second half and Kansas State was able to pull ahead to win 31–23.

Bright spots for Kansas State include Deuce Vaughn's rushing touchdown with less than two minutes in the game and a forced fumble at the end to close out the game.  Highlights for SIU included Cornerback P.J. Jules returning a 41-yard interception for the team's first defensive touchdown since 2018, and safety Qua Brown produced a team-high nine tackles in the game.  Southern Illinois also forced three turnovers in a row against the K-State offense.

After the game, plans seem to point to Howard taking the starting reigns like he did in the previous season.  Coach Klieman said that he will be staying for the "foreseeable future" at K-State.  In 2020, Howard led K-State to victories over Texas Tech, TCU, and Kansas.  SIU will host Dayton the next week in the first of fime home games.

Nevada

Sources: ESPN Box Score | ESPN Team Stats

In the week prior, Nevada completed their second win of the season by defeating Idaho State by a score of 49–10 and is at the top of the Mountain West Conference with a 2–0 record.  Oddsmakers go into the game considering the two teams to be well matched and expect a close game:  both teams have combined to score 48.5 points against their opponents in two games and both teams have the same record of 2 wins and 0 losses.

Nevada brought 6 foot 4 inch Carson Strong as their quarterback, who has been widely touted as a sought-after future quarterback for the National Football League.  Kansas State defense is looking forward to the challenge.  Coach Klieman's game plans include using the defensive line to put pressure on strong in the backfield and having the defensive backs "play the ball in the air" and go for interceptions.

Kansas State spent most of the game on the ground, led by Deuce Vaughn with 127 yards and one touchdown.  In this game, Sophomore Vaughn because the fastest in team history to achieve 1,000 career rushing yards in just 13 games.  Kansas State ran the football 48 times and only made 13 passing attempts.

Wildcat quarterback Jaren Lewis also got some time after three drives.  Lewis completed 2 for 3 passes with 9 yards.  Kansas Sate made a touchdown and field goal under his two drives.  Kansas State led 17–7 at halftime, but Nevada tied the game 17–17 in the third quarter.  It was in the fourth quarter when Kansas State made a clear statement for victory by scoring three touchdowns.

Sophomore quarterback Will Howard rushed for 56 yards and 2 touchdowns.  He did complete 7 of 10 passing attempts including a 68-yard touchdown pass to Daniel Imatorbhebhe on the second play of the game.

Kansas State's defense allowed a season-high 331 yards, but only 25 on the ground.  Nevada quarterback Carson strong wa sacked three times, one more than in their first two games combined.  The final score was Kansas State 38, Nevada 17.

Nevada's Carson Strong was successful in passing to nine different receivers.  His 14-yard touchdown pass to Elijah Cooks tied the score at 17 in the third quarter.  Nevada manage to tie the score up twice (7–7 and 17–17) but never held the lead.

Kansas State improved to 3–0 with the win and reduced Nevada to throwing short instead of long.  K-State Coach Klieman said, "We challenged the guys early in the week that we needed to take the next step as a football team. We were prepared for it. We were built for this."

Nevada is idle next week but then travels to play Boise State on October 2.

at Oklahoma State

Sources: ESPN box score  ESPN team stats

In the previous week, Oklahoma State narrowly defeated Boise State 21–20 in the face of a few injuries in their starting lineup.  Oklahoma State was ranked #22 in the Coaches Poll, and Kansas State was ranked #25 in the AP Poll.

Kansas State's defense prevented Oklahoma state from scoring any points in the second half of the game, but the 31 points scored in the first half was enough for the Cowboys to win.  Kansas State switched quarterbacks during the game as second-string Will Howard started the game but was injured and Jaren Lewis took over the bulk of the duties. Oklahoma state won 31–20.

No. 6 Oklahoma

Sources: ESPN box score ESPN team stats

Skylar Thompson returned from injury to start the game at quarterback and developed a 7–3 lead early on, keeping the score tied at 10–10 until just before halftime when Oklahoma managed a field goal to pull ahead 13–10.

In the third quarter, Kansas State executed an onside kick and recovered the ball.  After video review, the call on the field was confirmed as a Kansas State recovery. OU head coach Lincoln Riley then challenged the replay call for double-touching, claiming that Kansas State kicker Zentner contacted the ball twice while kicking it.  The challenge was upheld after a second review and Oklahoma was given the ball at midfield.  The second replay review was considered "controversial" and such challenges after video review are rare.  This and another officiating call reversal were critical to the Oklahoma victory:  final score Oklahoma 37, Kansas State 31.

Iowa State

Sources:ESPN box score ESPN team stats 

The 2021 annual rivalry known as "Farmageddon" began with Kansas State winning 15 of the last 16 games played in Manhattan, but the pattern failed to hold as Iowa State outperformed Kansas State on the field and on the scoreboard.  Kansas State failed to score in the second and third quarter, and only managed 20 points to Iowa State's consisten performance to tack up a total of 33.

Iowa State's Breece Hall ran 75 yards for a touchdown on the first play of the game, and Iowa State held the lead for the remainder of the game.  The Iowa State offensive line was given credit for not allowing any  sacks and giving quarterback Brock Purdy time to work.  Iowa state converted 9 of 15 third downs through the game.  Kansas State allowed Iowa state to gain half of its passing yards after the catch.

at Texas Tech

Sources:ESPN box score ESPN team stats 

Texas Tech scored fast.  On the second play of the game, Erik Ezukanma ran a 45-yard touchdown run.  On the ensuing kickoff, Malik Knowles fumbled and Tyrique Matthews recovered the ball at the 23-yard-line which led the Red Raiders to be up 14–0.  Texas Tech held a two-touchdown lead at halftime.

The second half worked out much differently.  Kansas State moved one step closer to bowl eligibility and improved its overall record to 4–3.  Kansas State brought standout great individual performances from Skylar Thompson, Deuce Vaughn, Felix Anudike-Uzomah and a punt by Ty Zentner.  Zentner's 63-yard punt put Texas Tech at its own 4.  On the next play, Anudike-Uzomah tackled the ball carrier in the end zone for a safety.  Texas Tech likely would have won the game without those two plays.

“It would have been easy to quit the way the game started. After losing three straight games, starting the game like that was obviously not what we wanted. We easily could have folded. But guys kept on fighting. It speaks volumes about where we're at as a program and the type of players we have.” – Skylar Thompson

The final score was 25–24, a one-point victory for Kansas State.  Texas Tech responded by firing head coach Matt Wells with his current record of 5 wins and 3 losses.

TCU

Sources: ESPN box score ESPN team stats

Last season TCU won five of their final six games and were considered a contender for the conference championship—but now come to the game with only 3 wins and 4 losses (1–3 in conference play) and may not qualify for a bowl game. TCU's previous game was a 29–17 home loss to West Virginia with three turnovers gave up 229 rushing yards.  The Horned Frogs have  allowed 5.4 yards per run so far this season—second to last in the Big 12.

Wildcat Felix Anudike-Uzomah set a new school and Big 12 record six sacks while also tying the NCAA single-game record.  After a post-game stat adjustment, he was given credit for four sacks and two forced fumbles.  TCU had two opportunities to score inside the 5 yard line, but the Kansas State defense held—the first time for the year that the Horned Frogs did not score while in the red zone.

Kansas State took the lead in the first quarter and held it for the entire game.  TCU managed to pull within 7–3 in the second quarter, but Kansas State made it 14–3 on the next series with a 42-yard run by Deuce Vaughn.

TCU managed a safety and also produced some quality plays, including Kendre Miller on a 61-yard carry to the 2-yard line—but TCU could not complete the final two yards in four plays for a score.  Their only score by the offense was a field goal.  TCU did hold Kansas State scoreless in the third quarter.

On Sunday after the game, TCU fired head coach Gary Patterson and will have Jerry Kill take over on an interim basis.

at Kansas

Sources: ESPN box score ESPN team stats

Coming into the game, the Jayhawks had only managed one win.  Kansas State averaged 27.5 points per game, while KU had averaged 15.8, but the Wildcats turned the ball over 12 times in the season so far to KU's 10 turnovers.  The Jayhawks came off a 55–3 loss against #15 Oklahoma State, but just two weeks prior had a 10–0 lead on Oklahoma at halftime.

Kansas State scored first and held the lead for the remainder of the game.  Deuce Vaughn had a 30-yard carry and ended the drive with a touchdown.  The Jayhawks responded with a field goal to put the score 7–3 in the first quarter.  Two plays later Kansas State scored on a 68-yard touchdown pass.

Kansas State won the game 35-10 and dominated in other statistics along the way:  The Wildcats managed 10 yards per play in the first three quarters, went 6–9 on third downs and piled on 499 total yards

West Virginia

Sources: ESPN box score ESPN team stats

West Virginia arrived at Kansas State with what was called a "must-win game" but failed to produce the victory.  The loss endangered the team's chance for a bowl game appearance for the season.  The Mountaineers will need to beat the Kansas Jayhawks and Texas Longhorns to become bowl eligible.

West Virginia's troubles began on the second play of the game, when Kansas State's Russ Yeast grabbed an interception from a pass that bounced off Winston Wright Jr.  Later on, Kansas State's Ty Bowman blocked a punt that was picked up by teammate Marvin Martin who ran it in for a special teams touchdown.  Kansas State led 17–3 at halftime and held a 24–10 lead at the start of the fourth quarter.

The fourth quarter saw Skylar Thompson convert on 4th-and 8 with a pass to Sammy Wheeler for 35 yards

West Virginia managed an impressive 10-play 68 yard touchdown drive, which included a 4th-down conversion at the Wildcat 12 yard line.  The Mountaineers did manage to produce multiple successful fourth-down conversions.

Kansas State's Deuce Vaughn ran for 121 yards and a touchdown, while Skylar Thompsan completed just 138 yards passing—but that included a touchdown catch and a "crucial fourth-down grab" to Sammy Wheeler.

Kansas State defeated West Virginia for the first time in six years.  Kansas State coach Klieman recognized that when he said, “This is a big-time win because we haven't had a whole lot of success against them.”

No. 11 Baylor

Sources: K-State Sports ESPN team stats ESPN box score

In the previous week's game, Baylor defeated the then-ranked #4 Oklahoma Sooners 27–14.

Baylor took the lead early in the game when they took advantage of a dropped punt and scored.  Baylor held the lead for the rest of the game.  Kansas State was able to close the lead to seven points but never took the lead.  During the game, both teams replaced their starting quarterbacks.  The final score was Baylor 20, Kansas State 10.

at Texas

Sources: ESPN box score ESPN team stats

Skylar Thompson was absent in the final regular season game for the Wildcats, and the statistics showed a lack of passing game.  However, Deuce Vaughn managed to exceed his average yards per game to put on 143 total yards, which puts him the fourth best in the country.

This was the fifth consecutive win for Texas over Kansas State, who had a one-point lead at halftime. Twice Kansas State attempted to convert on 4th and 1--failing both times. With the field goals from Longhorn Cameron Dicker, Texas pulled ahead to win.  The final score of the game was Texas 22, Kansas State 17.

Although Texas won the game and broke a six-game losing streak (its worst since 1956), they ended the game at 5 wins and 7 losses (3-6 in the conference) and are not bowl eligible. However, it is possible they could receive an invitation if there are not enough teams with six wins to fill all 82 bowl game openings. Kansas State's regular season record concluded at 7-5 (4-5 in conference) and expect a bowl game invitation on December 5.

LSU

Sources: ESPN Box Score ESPN Team Stats

Kansas State and Louisiana State were both selected to play in the Texas Bowl on January 4, 2022.  Coach Klieman remarked, “I am really proud of our team, especially our seniors, and our staff for their dedication throughout the season and display of our four core values – Discipline, Commitment, Toughness and Be Selfless. The story of the 2021 Wildcats still has one chapter to write, and we look forward to kick off the new year in Houston and prepare for what will be an exciting Texas Bowl.”

When the game began, Kansas State scored early and held the lead the entire game.  LSU was hampered, having lost its starting quarterback who transferred to Texas A&M and backup quarterback recovering from surgery.  LSU had senior receiver Jontre Kirklin move to quarterback.  Kirklin had not played as a quarterback since high school in 2016.  LSU did not get a first down until late in the second quarter and by that time Kansas State already had a 21–0 lead.  The final score was Kansas State 42, LSU 20.

Rankings

Statistics

Scoring

Scores by quarter

Coaching staff

References

Kansas State
Kansas State Wildcats football seasons
Texas Bowl champion seasons
Kansas State Wildcats football